Jessica Powers (February 7, 1905 – August 18, 1988) was an American poet and Carmelite nun.

Biography

Early years (1905–1936)
Jessica Powers was born on February 7, 1905, in Mauston, Wisconsin, the third child to John Powers and Delia Trainer Powers. By the time Jessica had turned 13, she lost both her older sister and father. She graduated from Mauston High School in 1922 and attended Marquette University for a year studying journalism. She then worked in Chicago before returning to care for her family after the death of her mother from 1925 to 1936.

Carmelite community (1941–1988)
After spending time in New York City, Powers decided to enter the Milwaukee, Wisconsin community of the Carmel of Mother of God as a postulant on June 24, 1941. On April 25, 1942, she received the habit of the Carmelites and was given the religious name of Sister Miriam of the Holy Spirit. She died of a stroke   on August 18, 1988.

Books
The Lantern Burns. New York: Monastine Press, 1939.
The Place of Splendor. New York: Cosmopolitan Science and Art Service, 1946.
The Little Alphabet. Milwaukee: Bruce Publishing Co., 1955.
Journey to Bethlehem. Pewaukee, WI: Carmelite Monastery, 1980.
The House at Rest. Pewaukee, WI: Carmelite Monsastery, 1984.
Selected Poetry of Jessica Powers. Regina Siegfried and Robert Morneau, eds. Kansas City, MO: Sheed & Ward, 1989.

Archival collections
The Jessica Powers Papers are held by the Marquette University Special Collections and University Archives. The collection includes her correspondence (mostly letters received), handwritten and typescript drafts of poems, clippings of her poetry and other writings from newspapers and magazines, and writings about her. Notable correspondents included August Derleth, Raymond E. F. Larsson, Robert F. Morneau, and Regina Siegfried.

References

External links

Jessica Powers Sister Miriam of the Holy Spirit OCD
The Jessica Powers Papers at Marquette University

1905 births
1988 deaths
People from Pewaukee, Wisconsin
People from Mauston, Wisconsin
Discalced Carmelite nuns
Poets from Wisconsin
20th-century American poets
American women poets
20th-century American women writers